AVIC Plaza, Shenzhen is a  skyscraper in Shenzhen, Guangdong, China. At the time it was completed in 2012, it became the thirty-fifth-tallest building in Shenzhen.

See also 
 List of tallest buildings in Shenzhen

References

Office buildings completed in 2012
Skidmore, Owings & Merrill buildings
Skyscraper office buildings in Shenzhen